Jefferson City, informally Jeff City, is the capital of the U.S. state of Missouri. It had a population of 43,228 at the 2020 census, ranking as the 15th most populous city in the state. It is also the county seat of Cole County and the principal city of the Jefferson City Metropolitan Statistical Area, the second-most-populous metropolitan area in Mid-Missouri and the fifth-largest in the state. Most of the city is in Cole County, with a small northern section extending into Callaway County. Jefferson City is named for Thomas Jefferson, the third President of the United States.

Jefferson City is located on the northern edge of the Ozark Plateau on the southern side of the Missouri River in a region known as Mid-Missouri, that is roughly mid-way between the state's two large urban areas of Kansas City and St. Louis. It is 29 miles (47 km) south of Columbia, Missouri, and sits at the western edge of the Missouri Rhineland, one of the major wine-producing regions of the Midwest. The city is dominated by the domed Capitol, which rises from a bluff overlooking the Missouri River to the north; Lewis and Clark passed the bluff on their historic expedition upriver before Europeans established any settlement there.

Many of Jefferson City's primary employers are in service and manufacturing industries. Jefferson City is also home to Lincoln University, a public historically black land-grant university founded in 1866 by the 62nd Regiment of U.S. Colored Troops with support from the 65th Regiment of U.S. Colored Troops.

History

In pre-Columbian times, this region was home of an ancient people known only as the "Mound Builders", being replaced by Osage Native Americans. In the late 17th century, frontiersmen started to inhabit the area, including Antoine de la Mothe Cadillac, Louis Jolliet, Jacques Marquette, Robert de LaSalle, and Daniel Boone, with the latter having the greatest influence on the region. Daniel Boone's son, Daniel Morgan Boone, would later lay out Jefferson City in the early 19th century.

When the Missouri Territory was organized in 1812, St. Louis was Missouri's seat of government, and St. Charles would serve as the next capital. However Jefferson City was chosen as the new capital in 1821. The village first was called "Lohman's Landing", and when the legislature decided to relocate there, they proposed the name "Missouriopolis" before settling on the city of "Jefferson" to honor Thomas Jefferson. Over the years, the city was most often referred to as "Jefferson City" and the name stuck. For years, this village was little more than a trading post located in the wilderness about midway between St. Louis and Kansas City. In 1825, the settlement was incorporated as a city and a year later, the Missouri legislature first met in Jefferson City.

Jefferson City was chosen as the site of a state prison. This prison, named the Missouri State Penitentiary, opened in 1836. This prison was home to multiple infamous Americans, including former heavyweight champion Sonny Liston, assassin James Earl Ray, and bank robber Pretty Boy Floyd.

During the Civil War, Jefferson City was occupied by Union troops and the elected state legislature was driven from Jefferson City by Union General Nathaniel Lyon. Some of the legislators later reconvened in Neosho and passed an ordinance of secession. Missouri was claimed by both the Confederacy and the Union, as was neighboring state Kentucky. Missourians were strongly divided and many people in the state—especially in St. Louis—supported the Union, while other areas (such as Missouri's Little Dixie) were strongly pro-Confederate along the Missouri River between Jefferson City and Kansas City.

German immigrants created vineyards in small towns on either side of the Missouri River, especially on the north from the city east to Marthasville, located outside of St. Louis. Known as the "Missouri Rhineland" for its vineyards and first established by German immigrants in the mid-1800s, this region has become part of Missouri's agricultural and tourist economy.

The city won a 2013 essay contest sponsored by Rand McNally, and was named "Most Beautiful Small Town".

2019 tornado

Approximately 15 minutes before midnight on May 22, 2019, a tornado emergency was issued for the Jefferson City area. Minutes later, a destructive EF-3 tornado caused extensive damage on the southwest side of the city.  At least 20 people were injured, but none were killed due to this tornado.

Geography

Climate
Jefferson City has a humid continental climate (Dfa) with hot, rainy summers and cold winters. Thunderstorms are common in both the spring and summer. Light snow is common during the winter, although about half of wintertime precipitation falls as rain.

Demographics

2010 census
At the 2010 census there were 43,079 people in 17,278 households, including 9,969 families, in the city. The racial makeup of the city was 78.0% White, 16.9% African American, 0.3% Native American, 1.8% Asian, 0.1% Pacific Islander, 0.8% from other races, and 2.2% from two or more races. Hispanic or Latino people of any race were 2.6%.

Of the 17,278 households 28.8% had children under the age of 18 living with them, 41.6% were married couples living together, 12.4% had a female householder with no husband present, 3.7% had a male householder with no wife present, and 42.3% were non-families. 36.2% of households were one person and 11.5% were one person aged 65 or older. The average household size was 2.21 and the average family size was 2.89.

The age distribution was 20.9% of residents under the age of 18, 10.3% between the ages of 18 and 24, 28.6% from 25 to 44, 26.8% from 45 to 64, and 13.4% 65 or older. The median age was 37.5 years. The gender makeup of the city was 51.2% male and 48.8% female.

2000 census
At the 2000 census there were 39,636 people in 15,794 households, including 9,207 families, in the city.  The population density was 1,454.4 people per square mile (561.6/km). There were 16,987 housing units at an average density of 623.3 per square mile (240.7/km).  The racial makeup of the city was 81.5% White, 14.7% Black or African American, 0.4% Native American, 1.2% Asian, 0.1% Pacific Islander, 0.6% from other races, and 1.5% from two or more races. 1.6% of the population were Hispanic or Latino of any race.
Of the 15,794 households 27.9% had children under the age of 18 living with them, 44.4% were married couples living together, 10.8% had a female householder with no husband present, and 41.7% were non-families. 36.1% of households were one person and 11.9% were one person aged 65 or older. The average household size was 2.21 and the average family size was 2.90.

The age distribution was 20.9% under the age of 18, 11.0% from 18 to 24, 32.1% from 25 to 44, 22.0% from 45 to 64, and 14.0% 65 or older. The median age was 36 years. For every 100 females, there were 105.3 males. For every 100 females age 18 and over, there were 106.6 males.

The median household income was $39,628 and the median family income was $52,627. Males had a median income of $35,050 versus $25,521 for females. The per capita income for the city was $21,268. About 7.3% of families and 11.5% of the population were below the poverty line, including 17.1% of those under age 18 and 7.1% of those age 65 or over.

Economy

Jefferson City's economy is driven by its residents, citizens of surrounding communities, and tourists.

Business
Jefferson City's economy is based on the government, health care, manufacturing, retail, education, and tourism industries. In 2016, Jefferson City's gross metropolitan product was $7.366 billion and Missouri's real total gross domestic product was $260.309 billion, making Jefferson City's economy 2.829% of the total gross state product of Missouri.

Central Bancompany, Hawthorn Bancshares, Capital Region Medical Center, and Arris Pizza all have their headquarters in Jefferson City. Jefferson City is also known for Central Dairy, whose products are shipped statewide.

Tourism
Tourists are drawn to the Missouri State Capitol, St. Peter Church (adjacent to the capitol), Missouri State Penitentiary, Missouri Governor's Mansion, and Missouri State Museum. Lincoln University, ranked by U.S. News & World Report in 2007 as a top educational institution for international students, also helps draw students and tourists from other states and countries.

Government

State government

The State Capitol is located in Jefferson City. In addition, state agencies are headquartered in Jefferson City. The Missouri State Archives is located in Jefferson City.

The Missouri Department of Corrections (MDOC) operates the Jefferson City Correctional Center (JCCC) and the Algoa Correctional Center (ACC) in Jefferson City. JCCC replaced the Missouri State Penitentiary on September 15, 2004, which until its closure was the oldest operating penal facility west of the Mississippi River. It served as the State of Missouri's primary maximum security institution, and it housed male death row prisoners until April 1989, when they were moved to the Potosi Correctional Center.

Federal government
The United States Postal Service operates several postal facilities. The Jefferson City Main Post Office building previously shared occupancy with the U.S. District Court from its dedication in November 1934 until September 27, 2011 when it moved into the Christopher S. Bond Court House.

The 118,000-square-foot courthouse is named for the former Governor and United States Senator from Missouri. The courthouse, which is occupied by the Central Division of the United States District Court for the Western District of Missouri and under the appellate jurisdiction of the United States Court of Appeals for the Eighth Circuit, was designed to achieve the U.S. Green Building Council's LEED Gold rating. Sustainable design features include reducing water use by 44 percent, using 13 percent recycled content, diverting 80 percent of construction waste materials from landfills, and it is 36 percent more efficient than current energy standards.

Education

Schools
Jefferson City Public School District currently operates Jefferson City High School and Capital City High School, two middle schools, Thomas Jefferson Middle School, and Lewis and Clark Middle School, and eleven elementary schools.
In addition to public education, there are also five private elementary schools and three private high schools, including Helias High School and Calvary Lutheran High School in the city.

Colleges and universities
Lincoln University is a public historically black university with open enrollment and certificate, associate, bachelor, and graduate programs.

Columbia College, William Woods University, Metro Business College, and Merrell University also have campuses in the city with varying degree levels and options.

The University of Missouri, the state's flagship university, is 30 miles to the north in Columbia.

Public library
Jefferson City has a public library, the Missouri River Regional Library.

Media

Print
The major daily English-language newspaper in the area is the Jefferson City News Tribune. Several monthly magazines cover Jefferson City and/or the surrounding areas: Jefferson City Magazine, Her Magazine, Capital Lifestyles, and Professional Day.

Television
Jefferson City, along with Columbia, is part of the Mid-Missouri television market. KRCG, the region's CBS affiliate, and KFDR, a station owned by the Christian Television Network (CTN), are both licensed to the city.

Radio
The following is a list of radio stations that broadcast from and/or are licensed to Jefferson City, Missouri.

Infrastructure

Transportation

Highways
Federal highways are U.S. Routes 50, 54, and 63. Missouri Routes 179 and 94 also run through the city. Jefferson City is one of the four state capitals that is not served by an Interstate highway; Interstate 70 passes by the city  to the north in Columbia.

Airports
The city is served by Columbia Regional Airport and nearby Jefferson City Memorial Airport.

Public transportation

Local transit
JeffTran, the city operated public transit system, provides year-round bus service during traditional weekday business hours, but is currently considering the extension of service hours to include evenings and weekends.

Intercity transit
The Jefferson City station, located in the former Union Hotel at Jefferson Landing State Historic Site, is one of the Missouri River Runner train stops between Kansas City and St. Louis, provided by Amtrak, the sole intercity passenger railroad service in the United States.

A Greyhound bus stop near the Eastland Drive Convenient Food Mart also provides intercity transit. Jefferson City Memorial Airport, which is located in the Jefferson City limits of Callaway County, Missouri, serves general aviation but has no scheduled commercial airline service.

Healthcare
Jefferson City is home to SSM Health St. Mary's Hospital which has 154 beds.

Notable people

Sister city
Jefferson City is the sister city to the German city of Münchberg. Around 200 years ago, settlers from Münchberg founded a neighborhood south of downtown Jefferson City, which is still known as "Old Munichburg".

See also

Columbia – a city in Missouri near Jefferson City
Capital Mall – a mall in Jefferson City
Cathedral of St. Joseph – a cathedral in Jefferson City

References

Further reading

External links
City of Jefferson government website
Jefferson City Convention and Visitor's Bureau
 Historic maps of Jefferson City in the Sanborn Maps of Missouri Collection at the University of Missouri

 
1821 establishments in Missouri
Cities in Callaway County, Missouri
Cities in Cole County, Missouri
Jefferson City metropolitan area
Cities in Missouri
County seats in Missouri
Missouri populated places on the Missouri River
Missouri Rhineland
Populated places established in 1821
State capitals in the United States